National Route 252 is a national highway of Japan connecting Kashiwazaki, Niigata and Aizuwakamatsu, Fukushima in Japan, with a total length of 204.6 km (127.13 mi).

Route description
A section of National Route 252 in the town of Kaneyama in Fukushima Prefecture is a musical road. Parts of the highway close in winter, making the Tadami line the only means of transport between several towns.

See also
Tadami Line

References

National highways in Japan
Roads in Fukushima Prefecture
Roads in Niigata Prefecture
Musical roads in Japan